The 2023 Cazoo Grand Slam of Darts, is the seventeenth staging of the Grand Slam of Darts, organised by the Professional Darts Corporation. The event will take place at the Aldersley Leisure Village, Aldersley, Wolverhampton, 11–19 November 2023.

Michael Smith is the defending champion, after defeating Nathan Aspinall 16–5 in the 2022 final,.

Prize money

The prize fund for the Grand Slam remained the same as the year before at £650,000.

Qualification 

The qualifiers are:

PDC Qualifying Tournaments 

If the list of qualifiers from the main tournaments produced fewer than the required number of players (16), the field will be filled from the reserve lists. The first list consisted of the winners from 2022 European Tour events, in which the winners were ordered firstly by number of wins, then by Order of Merit position order at the cut-off date.

If there are still not enough qualifiers after European Tour events are added, the winners of 2023 Players Championship events will be added, firstly in order by number of wins, then in Order of Merit order.

PDC Qualifying Event 
A further eight places in the Grand Slam of Darts were filled by qualifiers from a PDC Tour Card Holder qualifier held on 3 November in Barnsley.

These are the qualifiers:

Additional Qualifiers 
The winners of these tournaments and tours also qualified for the tournament.

Draw

Pools

Group stage
All group matches are best of nine legs  After three games, the top two in each group qualify for the knock-out stage

NB: P = Played; W = Won; L = Lost; LF = Legs for; LA = Legs against; +/− = Plus/minus record, in relation to legs; Pts = Points; Status = Qualified to knockout stage

Group A

11 November

12 November

13 November

Group B 

11 November

12 November

13 November

Group C 

11 November

12 November

13 November

Group D 

11 November

12 November

13 November

Group E 

11 November

12 November

14 November

Group F 

11 November

12 November

14 November

Group G 

11 November

12 November

14 November

Group H 

11 November

12 November

14 November

Knockout stage

References

External links 
Official website

2023
Grand Slam
Grand Slam of Darts